Drożyna  is a village in the administrative district of Gmina Radwanice, within Polkowice County, Lower Silesian Voivodeship, in south-western Poland.

The village has a population of 80.

References

Villages in Polkowice County